Académica or Académica e Sporting de Timor is a football club based in Dili, East Timor. The team plays in the Liga Futebol Amadora and was one of the original eight teams that participated in the first season of the Primeira Divisão in 2016. The club also includes a partnered futsal team that is set to compete in the Pra Liga Futsal Timor-Leste.

Squad List 
As of August 2020

Head Coach: Marcos G

Head Trainer: Salvador de Sousa

Competition records

Campeonato Provincial 

 1973: 5th place
 1974: 3rd place

Super Liga 
2005–06: 3rd place

Liga Futebol Amadora

Primeira Divisão 

2016: 4th place
2017: 5th place
2018: 6th place
2019: 7th place (Relegated)

Segunda Divisão 

 2021: 1st in Group A (Promoted). Lost in final.

Taça 12 de Novembro
2016: 2nd Round
2018: Preliminary Round
2019: Quarter Finals

Copa FFTL 

 2020: 5th in group B

References

Football clubs in East Timor
Football
Sport in Dili
Association football clubs established in 1967